Elophila separatalis is a moth in the family Crambidae. It was described by John Henry Leech in 1889. It is found in China, North Korea and Honshu, Japan.

The length of the forewings is 10.1 mm for males and 10.7-11.3 mm for females.

References

Acentropinae
Moths described in 1889
Moths of Asia
Aquatic insects